Nickle may refer to:

People
 Carl Nickle (1914–1990), Canadian editor and publisher, oil baron and politician
 Don Nickles (born 1948), American politician, former Senator from Oklahoma
 Doug Nickle (born 1974), Major League Baseball relief pitcher
 Robert Nickle (1919–1980), American artist
 Robert Nickle (British Army officer) (1786–1855), major general, a commander of the forces in Australia
 Sonny Nickle (born 1969), English rugby league footballer
 William Folger Nickle (1869–1957), Canadian politician, father of William McAdam Nickle
 William McAdam Nickle (1897–1968), Canadian politician

Fictional characters
 Lucas Nickle, protagonist of the children's book The Ant Bully and film The Ant Bully

Other uses
 Nickle (programming language), a numeric oriented programming language 
 European green woodpecker, sometimes called a nickle
 Nickle Arts Museum, also known as The Nickle; see List of museums in Alberta, Canada

See also
 Nickle Resolution, a controversial resolution in 1917 regarding the use of titles in Canada 
 Nickel (disambiguation)